Turee Creek Station, often referred to as Turee Creek and also known as Turee Station, is a pastoral lease that operates as a cattle station.

The station is split into two blocks separated by crown land. The homestead is situated on the southern block. This block consists of the broad alluvial plains of Turee Creek flanked by hardpan plains. The northern block is made up of a narrow river valley flanked by jagged hills and undulating plains.

The station was owned in 1932 by Piesse and Maguire, who were trading in bullocks to the sale yards in Meekatharra.

In 1979 the property was stocked with 1,522 head of cattle and was estimated to be able to support 3,050 head in a good season.

In 2003 the property was owned and managed by Bruce and Suzanne Maguire and was running a herd of 3,700 cattle. Tourists are able to visit the property as part of the Outback Mail Tour where Polar Aviation, the mail contractors, are able to take tourists along when they complete their deliveries once a week.

See also
List of ranches and stations

References

Pastoral leases in Western Australia
Stations (Australian agriculture)
Pilbara